Charlotte Hamlyn (born ) is a Western Australian journalist, reporter, and news presenter for the Australian Broadcasting Corporation.

Hamlyn graduated from the University of Western Australia in 2008 with a degree in Communications/English,
and started her media career working for a newspaper in Kalgoorlie. In 2008 and 2009 she was an exchange student at the University of Pennsylvania.

She started at the ABC in 2009, working as a journalist and reporter, travelling around Western Australia, and overseas for Foreign Correspondent.
She also regularly appeared on ABC Radio Perth, including co-hosting the weekend Breakfast program.

Hamlyn presented the ABC News for one month in 2013, filling in while James McHale was on leave.
She presented that news on Friday-Sunday from September 2020 until August 2021 when she went on maternity leave. She was replaced by Briana Shepherd, then returned in June 2022.

Hamlyn is a member of the board of the arts organisation Form.

References

ABC News (Australia) presenters
Australian radio presenters
Australian women radio presenters
Australian television journalists
Australian women television presenters
Australian women journalists
Journalists from Western Australia
Living people
University of Pennsylvania alumni
University of Western Australia alumni
1980s births
Year of birth missing (living people)